Copenhagen Fashion Week is an international fashion event, held twice a year in Copenhagen.

History

The first Copenhagen Fashion Week was held in 2006, the result of a merger of previous Danish clothing trade fairs, Dansk Modeuge and Dansk Herremodeuge, which date back to the 1950s. Copenhagen Fashion Week is owned by the Danish Fashion Institute.

In 2017, Copenhagen Fashion Week went through a strategic process with the participation of key stakeholders in the fashion industry. The aim of the strategy was to strengthen Copenhagen as the epicentre of Scandinavian fashion and to establish Copenhagen Fashion Week as the leading fashion week in Scandinavia. In 2019, Copenhagen Fashion Week became the only fashion week in Scandinavia and will keep striving towards maintaining and develop Copenhagen Fashion Week — to continue being the strongest platform possible for Scandinavian fashion brands to thrive. 
In 2018, Copenhagen Fashion Week got a new management which brought about a highly intensified focus on sustainability. Newly appointed CEO Cecilie Thorsmark (2018) established a sustainability advisory board of industry professionals and welcomed onboard knowledge partner In Futurum to help shape the sustainable development of Copenhagen Fashion Week.
Hosting an international fashion week, the city of Copenhagen is a big part of what makes Copenhagen Fashion Week the desired destination it is. We love our city and we want to enable our guests to experience everything Copenhagen has to offer, whether they are locals or visitors. Through events, unique show venues, easy logistics for participating industry professionals, a personal approach for ultimate comfort and an insider’s guide to the city, we want to showcase the city in a way that will make both Copenhagen Fashion Week and the city of Copenhagen an intimate and memorable experience.

Organization

Copenhagen Fashion Week is Scandinavia’s only fashion week, taking place biannually in January/February and August. Each season, Copenhagen Fashion Week welcomes esteemed press, buyers and influencers to four days of shows, presentations and events as well as the two trade shows CIFF and Revolver.  Sustainability is the core focus area for Copenhagen Fashion Week. Copenhagen Fashion Week strives towards making substantial changes to the way the event is executed, and works to inspire and encourage the industry to take steps towards becoming more sustainable.

Copenhagen Fashion Week is a non-profit organisation run on 15% public funding and 85% commercial partnerships, with the Danish Ministry of Industry, Business and Financial Affairs as our main contributor. Copenhagen Fashion Week is a subsidiary to the foundation Design Society alongside Danish Design Centre, INDEX: Design to Improve Life and Global Fashion Agenda. The commercial partnerships Copenhagen Fashion Week takes part in are based on a shared vision of sustainability and innovation, and are set in place to ensure the best possible experience for participating brands, press and buyers. All commercial posts are marked with a mandatory disclaimer of sponsored content, in accordance with Danish law, and is created in line with Copenhagen Fashion Week’s ethical charter.

The applications for the official fashion week schedule are assessed by a committee of representatives from the Scandinavian fashion industry, including press, production professionals and industry organizations. The Copenhagen Fashion Week secretariat does not participate in the assessment. Copenhagen Fashion Week has no influence over guest lists, choice of models or any other part concerning a brand’s show or presentation on the official schedule. For the first time, in 2023, the organisers have implemented sustainability requirements for participating fashion brands.

References

External links 
 
 Copenhagen Fashion Weeks website
 Copenhagen Fashion Week TV
 Fashion Week for all
 Gallery website

Fashion events in Denmark
Fashion weeks
Festivals in Copenhagen